Abouzeid is a surname. Notable people with the surname include:

Gaber Abouzeid (1954–2020), Egyptian volleyball player
Leila Abouzeid (born 1950), Moroccan writer
Taher Abouzeid (born 1962), Egyptian footballer

Arabic-language surnames